Manooke, alternatively spelt as Manuke, is a village situated in the Nihal Singhwala tehsil of the Moga district of the state of Punjab, India. It located is approximately 9 km away from the sub-district headquarter of Nihal Singhwala (tehsildar office), and 28 km south away from Moga, the eponymous city of the district. The total literacy rate of Manooke is 64.79%, out of which the individual literacy values by sex are 67.26% for males and 61.99% for females of the locality. There are about 1,987 houses located in the village. 3,358 persons of the village belong to Scheduled Castes. The village belongs to the Malwai culture and the Malwai dialect of Punjabi is spoken by the locals.

References 

Populated places in Punjab, India
Villages in Moga district